Thomas Cuthbert Harrison (6 July 1906 – 21 January 1981) was a British racing driver from England. He was born in Ecclesall, Sheffield, and also died in Sheffield. He participated in three World Championship Formula One Grands Prix, debuting on 13 May 1950. He scored no championship points. He founded the T.C.Harrison Ford dealership.

Complete Formula One World Championship results
(key)

References
 "The Grand Prix Who's Who", Steve Small, 1995.

1906 births
1981 deaths
English racing drivers
English Formula One drivers
Racing drivers from Yorkshire
Grand Prix drivers
Sportspeople from Sheffield